Smerinthulus perversa, the lichenous hawkmoth, is a species of moth of the family Sphingidae. It is known from Taiwan, Nepal, north-eastern India, northern Myanmar, south-western and southern China and Thailand.

The wingspan is 62–90 mm. It is similar to Smerinthulus dohrni but there is a blackish shadowy postdiscal band on the hindwing upperside.

Subspecies
Smerinthulus perversa perversa (Nepal, north-eastern India, northern Myanmar, south-western China and Thailand)
Smerinthulus perversa flavomaculatus Inoue, 1990 (Taiwan)
Smerinthulus perversa pallidus Mell, 1922 (southern China)

References

Smerinthulus
Moths described in 1895